Platitude was a Swedish progressive power metal band formed in 1995, however a permanent line-up was not established until 1997. After three demos, they signed a deal with the Italian label Scarlet Records in the spring of 2002. They released three albums before disbanding in 2008.

In late October 2005, new deals were signed with the German Metal Heaven and Japanese King Records for distribution in Europe and Japan respectively.

In May 2003, Platitude joined the Danish heavy metal band Manticora on a European tour and later the same year supported the British progressive metal band Threshold. They have played gigs all over Europe including opening for Finnish power metal band Sonata Arctica in 2004 at a show in Copenhagen.

Since their dissolution in 2008, several band members have been involved in other projects.

Members

Last line-up
Erik "EZ" Blomkvist (Seven Thorns, Dreamscape) - vocals, bass
Gustav Köllerström - guitars
Kristofer von Wachenfeldt (Care of Night) - keyboards
Patrik Janson - bass
Erik Wigelius - drums

Former members
Daniel Hall (Rob Rock) - guitars
Johan Randén - stand-in guitars
Tommie Lundgren - keyboards
Andreas Lindahl (ZooL) - keyboards
Marcus Höher - drums
Andreas Brobjer (Space Odyssey) - drums

Discography

Studio albums
Secrets of Life (2002)
Nine (2004)
Silence Speaks (2006)

Demos
Wings of Time (2001)

References 

Musical groups established in 1995
Musical groups disestablished in 2008
Swedish progressive metal musical groups
Swedish power metal musical groups
Scarlet Records artists